Exact Sciences Corp. is a molecular diagnostics company specializing in the detection of early stage cancers. The company's initial focus was on the early detection and prevention of colorectal cancer, in 2014 it launched Cologuard, the first stool DNA test for colorectal cancer. Since then Exact Sciences has grown its product portfolio to encompass other screening and precision oncological tests for other types of cancer.

History
Exact Sciences was founded in 1995 in Marlborough, Massachusetts by Stanley Lapidus and Anthony Shuber as a company focused on the development of a non-invasive test for colorectal cancer. The company eventually went public with an initial offering on the NASDAQ in 2001. In the early years, there was much speculation that the company would be acquired by a competitor or exit the market; during this time the company's share price fell to less than one dollar.

A significant turnaround in the company's fortunes began with the announcement of a mutual collaboration and licensing agreement between Exact Sciences and the Mayo Clinic in June 2009. In the same year, the company appointed Kevin Conroy as CEO & president and moved its head office to Madison, Wisconsin.

In August 2014, Exact Sciences received premarket approval from the Food and Drug Administration for the use and marketing of its flagship product, Cologuard. This breakthrough heralded the beginning of a period of rapid growth for Exact Sciences and the start of its first foray into the acquisitions market.

In August 2017, the company made its first major acquisition when it purchased Sampleminded, a healthcare information technology company based in Salt Lake City, Utah, for $3.2 million. This was followed by the January 2018 announcement that Exact Sciences had completed a $690 million convertible bond offering and the revelation that the company was to acquire Armune Bioscience, a cancer diagnostic developer based in Kalamazoo and Ann Arbor, Michigan (announced during that year's J.P Morgan Healthcare Conference).  Third-quarter financial reports revealed the price of the Armune Bioscience acquisition to be valued at $12 million, plus $17.5 million in incentives for certain milestones. Later, in October 2018, Exact Sciences announced its purchase of Biomatrica, a developer of sample preservation technology based in San Diego, California. Financial reports revealed the purchase price to be $20 million with an additional $20 million in incentives for certain milestones.

In summer 2019, Exact Sciences opened a new 169,000 square feet lab and warehouse facility to expand its testing capacity for Cologuard and, in its largest acquisition yet, announced its intention to buy Genomic Health, a genetic cancer detection company based in Redwood City, California, for $2.8 billion. The reason given for this latest acquisition was to both expand Exact Sciences' product portfolio through the addition of Genomic Health's OncotypeIQ suite of precision tests, and expand into other markets outside the US on the back of Genomic Health's existing network. The deal with Genomic Health led to the opening of Exact Sciences offices in the United Kingdom, France, Germany, Italy and Japan, and the foundation of Exact Sciences International, with its headquarters initially in Geneva and later in Zug, Switzerland.

In March 2020, Exact Sciences purchased Paradigm Diagnostics and Viomics, two companies based in Phoenix, Arizona that would  expand their lab testing and research and development capabilities. Later, in October 2020, the company again announced a round of acquisitions - this time of Thrive Earlier Detection Corp. (based in Cambridge, Massachusetts) and Base Genomics (based in Oxford, England), two companies specializing in one of Exact Sciences' pipeline areas - blood-based cancer screening.

Exact Sciences responded to the 2020 COVID-19 pandemic by temporarily refocusing a portion of its diagnostic capacity to testing for the disease. The company received FDA regulatory approval to provide home testing kits in April 2020, becoming one of the first companies in the U.S. to do so.

In early 2021, Exact Sciences announced its acquisition of Ashion Analytics and plans to collaborate in research with TGen, the City Of Hope's Genomics Institute. This news came shortly after the company's decision to purchase an exclusive-use license of TGen's proprietary liquid biopsy-based test technology, Tardis.

Acquisition history

The following is an illustration of the company's major mergers and acquisitions and historical predecessors (this is not a comprehensive list):

Partnerships
Since 2009, Exact Sciences has maintained a collaboration with Mayo Clinic for its current and future products.  In 2009, Exact Sciences also completed a licensing agreement with Hologic for its molecular detection platform. In April 2017, Exact Sciences and MDxHealth agreed to share technology on a variety of epigenetics and molecular diagnostics applications for five years. In August 2018, Exact Sciences and Pfizer announced an agreement through 2021 to co-promote Cologuard. In November 2018, Exact Sciences announced a partnership with Epic Systems for order entries.

Exact Sciences has, since 2015, been sponsor of the Cologuard Classic, a professional golf tournament on the PGA Tour Champions tournament circuit held annually at the Catalina Course of the Omni Tucson National Resort, in Tucson, Arizona.

Products

Pipeline
Pipeline products include esophageal, breast, lung, liver, and pancreatic cancer testing. The company is also working with the Mayo Clinic to identify biomarkers associated with the 15 deadliest cancers. Other initiatives focus on: 
Using experience gained from the development of Cologuard to create a wider cancer detection platform
Expanding the range Oncotype IQ products to include liquid and tissue-based tests
Adapting biomarker-based technologies create a liquid biopsy capable of detecting cancers and precancers from a blood sample
Improving analytical sensitivity using the company's existing multi-marker approach to better identify cancerous samples

References

External links
 

Companies listed on the Nasdaq
Health care companies established in 1995
American companies established in 1995
1995 establishments in Massachusetts
Companies based in Madison, Wisconsin
2001 initial public offerings
Life sciences industry
Health care companies based in Wisconsin
Medical genetics
Genomics companies
Pharmaceutical companies of the United States
Pharmaceutical companies established in 1995